Aminul Islam (1 January 1935 – 29 November 2017) was a Bangladeshi academic. He was the President of Bangladesh Academy of Sciences. He was a fellow of the academy since 1978.

Early life and education
Islam was born on 1 January 1935 in Nagerchar village of Homna Upazila of Comilla District. He completed his B.Sc. (Hons.) in chemistry in 1954 and M.Sc. in Soil Science in 1955 from the University of Dhaka and Ph.D. in Soil Science from Michigan State University in 1962.

Career
Islam started his teaching career at the University of Dhaka in 1956 and worked at the Department of Soil Science until 1996. He then served as the Vice-Chancellor of Bangladesh National University (1996-2000) and Daffodil International University during 2002–2011. In May 2016, he started serving as a President of Bangladesh Academy of Sciences and Science Council of Asia.

Awards 
 President's Gold Medal (1981)
 Bangladesh Academy of Sciences Gold Medal Award (1986)
 Independence Day Award (1990)

References 

1935 births
2017 deaths
University of Dhaka alumni
Michigan State University alumni
Academic staff of the University of Dhaka
Bangladeshi soil scientists
Fellows of Bangladesh Academy of Sciences
Recipients of the Independence Day Award
People from Comilla District
Vice-Chancellors of National University Bangladesh
Honorary Fellows of Bangla Academy